Arthur James Robertson (19 April 1879 – 18 April 1957) was a Scottish runner who competed at the 1908 Summer Olympics in London. He won the gold medal in the 3-mile team race and a silver in the steeplechase.

Career
The son of a Glasgow doctor, Robertson was educated at Kelvinside Academy, Glasgow, before moving to King's School, Peterborough at the age of 14.  A brilliant all-round sportsman, he initially concentrated on cycling and only took up serious athletics at the age of 25, after a cycling injury.

In 1906, he joined Birchfield Harriers. In March 1908 he won both the English and International Cross-Country Championships and a second-place finish in the 4 mile race at the AAA championship earned him a place at the Olympics.

Robertson won easily in the first round of the 3200 metres steeplechase, finishing in 11:10.0. In the final, he trailed for most of the race.  At the bell, he passed one of the two then-leaders, American John Eisele.  Robertson was not quite able to catch the other leader, however, and trailed fellow Briton Arthur Russell by two yards at the finish. His final time was 10:48.4. At the same Olympics he won gold as a member of the 3-man 3 mile team race; the first Olympic gold won by a Scottish man and the first by a Birchfield athlete. He also participated in the five miles event and finished fifth. His brother David was a member of the British cycling team at the same olympics.

On 13 September 1908 Robertson set a world record at 15:01.2 over 5,000 metres, running on a concrete cycle track in Stockholm. He retired from athletics after 1909 season and returned to cycling. Later, together with his brother, he ran a sports shop in Peterborough, and then passed it over to his son.

Robertsone was posthumously inducted into the Scottish Sporting Hall of Fame in 2004. In January 2010, a new J D Wetherspoon pub in Perry Barr, Birmingham (close to Perry Barr Stadium, the former home of Birchfield Harriers) was named 'The Arthur Robertson' in his honour.

References

Further reading

 Buchanan, Ian  British Olympians. Guinness Publishing (1991) 
Databaseolympics.com

1879 births
1957 deaths
Sportspeople from Peterborough
Sportspeople from Sheffield
Scottish male long-distance runners
British male steeplechase runners
Scottish male steeplechase runners
Olympic athletes of Great Britain
Olympic gold medallists for Great Britain
Olympic silver medallists for Great Britain
Athletes (track and field) at the 1908 Summer Olympics
Scottish Olympic medallists
Birchfield Harriers
International Cross Country Championships winners
Medalists at the 1908 Summer Olympics
Olympic gold medalists in athletics (track and field)
Olympic silver medalists in athletics (track and field)